Alessandro Gatto (born 2 February 1994) is an Italian football player. He plays for Trapani.

Club career
He made his Serie B debut for Modena on 4 October 2014 in a game against Bari.

On 30 July 2019, he signed a 2-year contract with Bisceglie.

On 5 September 2020 he joined Catania on a 2-year contract. On 11 January 2021 he was loaned to Cavese.

References

External links
 

1994 births
Sportspeople from Taranto
Footballers from Apulia
Living people
Italian footballers
Association football forwards
A.S. Martina Franca 1947 players
Taranto F.C. 1927 players
Hellas Verona F.C. players
Modena F.C. players
Pordenone Calcio players
S.S. Juve Stabia players
S.S. Monopoli 1966 players
F.C. Südtirol players
A.S. Bisceglie Calcio 1913 players
Catania S.S.D. players
Cavese 1919 players
Trapani Calcio players
Serie B players
Serie C players
Serie D players